Progres may refer to:

 Progres, Kardzhali Province, a village in Momchilgrad Municipality, Kardzhali Province, Bulgaria
 El Progrés, Badalona, Catalonia, Spain
 Toyota Progrès, a mid-sized Japanese luxury sedan
 FC Progrès Niederkorn (aka Progrès), Niederkorn, Luxembourg; a soccer team
 PROGRES (Programme of Research on the Service Economy)
 Le Progrès, a daily newspaper from Lyon, Rhone, France
 Le Progrès (Réunion), a political party
 'Progres 2', a Czech rock band

See also

 Haïti Progrès, a daily U.S. newspaper focused on Haiti
 Le Progrès Egyptien, a daily French-language Egyptian newspaper
 
 Progress (disambiguation)